The 1990–91 Ohio Bobcats men's basketball team represented Ohio University in the college basketball season of 1990–91. The team was coached by Larry Hunter and played their home games at the Convocation Center.

Roster

Schedule

|-
!colspan=9 style=| Non-conference regular season

|-
!colspan=9 style=| MAC regular season

|-

|-
!colspan=9 style=| MAC Tournament

Statistics

Team Statistics
Final 1990–91 Statistics

Source

Player statistics

Source

References

General
Final 1991 Division I Men's Basketball Statistics Report
Ohio Record Book

Ohio Bobcats men's basketball seasons
Ohio
Bob
Bob